The government of Mamuka Bakhtadze was the government (cabinet) of Georgia, with Mamuka Bakhtadze as its head as the country's Prime Minister. The government was formed by the ruling Georgian Dream–Democratic Georgia coalition after the preceding one was dissolved following Prime Minister Giorgi Kvirikashvili's resignation on 13 June 2018. The incoming government won the parliamentary vote of confidence with 99 votes in favor to 6 against on 20 June 2018. The cabinet was reconfirmed, with 101 votes in favor to 12 against, by the parliament on 14 July after the previously announced structural reforms in the cabinet ministries were implemented. In a post on Facebook on 2 September 2019, Bakhtadze announced his resignation, saying that "at this stage", he has accomplished his mission.

Ministers

References 

Government of Georgia (country)
2018 establishments in Georgia (country)
Cabinets established in 2018
2019 disestablishments in Georgia (country)
Cabinets disestablished in 2019